Dejphon Chansiri is a Thai businessman who currently owns Football League One club Sheffield Wednesday.

Chansiri's family controls the Thai Union Group, the world's largest producer of canned tuna. The Chansiri family is estimated by Forbes to be worth $720m as of 5/7/19. In January 2015, a consortium led by Chansiri acquired a 100% stake in Sheffield Wednesday from Milan Mandarić for £37.5m and targeted promotion to the Premier League by 2017.

During the summer of 2015, Chansiri changed many aspects of the Sheffield Wednesday set-up including the backroom staff and players, such as sacking manager Stuart Gray and replacing him with Carlos Carvalhal, who had previously managed Turkish side Besiktas and several clubs in his home country of Portugal.

References

Living people
Dejphon Chansiri
Sheffield Wednesday F.C. directors and chairmen
Place of birth missing (living people)
Year of birth missing (living people)